Keradeh (also Romanized as Kerādeh and Karādeh; also known as Kasrā Deh) is a village in Aliabad Rural District, Khafr District, Jahrom County, Fars Province, Iran. At the 2006 census, its population was 897, in 247 families.

References 

Populated places in  Jahrom County